The WAAA Championships was an annual track and field competition organised by the Women's Amateur Athletic Association (WAAA) in England. It was the foremost domestic athletics event for women during its lifetime.

Since 1880, the Amateur Athletic Association of England had held the AAA Championships, but it admitted men only and did not wish to include women. Women's clubs and competitions were typically separate from the men's and in line with growing interest in the sport the WAAA was founded in 1922. Several contests in the country were approved by the WAAA with "Championships of England" status that year, and this was subsequently replaced with an organised WAAA Championships in 1923. Aside from the 1927 championships in Reading, Berkshire, the WAAA track and field event was based at various locations in London up to 1939. The competition was interrupted by World War II but was re-instigated in 1945 and remained in London until a move to Birmingham in 1985.

As women's athletics developed in the 20th century, major international men's and women's events typically were held in conjunction, with women first appearing on the Olympic athletics programme in 1928 and the European Athletics Championships being fully combined by its third edition in 1946. The AAA and WAAA events remained divided for much longer and it was not until 1988 that the women's events were merged into an all-gender AAA Championships in 1988, though the WAAA remained the organiser of the women's events. This change came during a period of reform that would see the sport fully professionalise and, in the UK, organisation move to national level.

The establishment of UK Athletics in 1999 to serve as the national governing body for professional, elite athletics ultimately started the decline of the AAA Championships. UK Athletics took over the role of both national championships and international team selection with its own British Athletics Championships from 2007 onwards.

The long-distance track events, marathon, racewalking events and combined track and field events were regularly held outside of the main track and field championship competition.

Events
The following athletics events featured as standard on the main WAAA Championships programme:

 Sprint: 100 m, 200 m, 400 m
 Distance track events: 800 m, 1500 m, 3000 m (until 1999) 5000 m
 Hurdles: 100 m hurdles, 400 m hurdles, 3000 m steeplechase
 Jumps: long jump, triple jump, high jump, pole vault
 Throws: shot put, discus, hammer, javelin

The following events were regularly held, but often outside of the main programme:

 Long-distance track events: 10,000 m
 Combined events: pentathlon/heptathlon
 Walks: 5000 m walk, 10,000 m walk
 Road running: marathon

Races were contested, and field events measured, in yards and feet up until 1968. The 2000 metres steeplechase was held in 2002 and 2003 before moving to the standard 3000 m distance. The 80 metres hurdles was contested until 1968 before being replaced by the new international standard 100 metres hurdles. The 200 metres hurdles was on the programme from 1961 to 1972, before being dropped in favour of the 400 metres hurdles. A 60 metres event was available from 1935 to 1950. A women's mile run was first contested in 1936, indicating a growing acceptance to women taking part in distance events. The 3000 metres was introduced in 1968 and lasted until 1999. The standard 5000 metres and 10,000 metres events came after, being first held in 1980 as non-championship events before achieving full status.

The field events expanded roughly in line with international changes. The triple jump first appeared in 1989, followed by championship events in pole vault and hammer throw in 1993, bringing women to parity with men in field events. A women's pentathlon (first held in 1949) was replaced with a heptathlon in 1981.

Racewalking events underwent progressive change in distance, from 880 yards (1923–1927), to one mile (1928–1932), rounded down to 1600 m in 1933 to 1939, back to one mile (1945–1958), up to 1.5 miles (1960–68), then 2500 m (1969–1972), 3000 m in 1973 and 1974, before finally reaching the 5000 m distance in 1975. A 10,000 m walk was introduced in 1978. A variety of relay races were contested by clubs prior to 1960.

Editions

Most successful athletes by event

References

Editions
WAAA Championships. Power of 10. Retrieved 2018-04-04.

 
Women's athletics competitions
Women's sports competitions in England
Defunct athletics competitions
Athletics competitions in England
Recurring sporting events established in 1923
Recurring sporting events disestablished in 2006
National championships in the United Kingdom
National athletics competitions
Defunct sports competitions in England